Zaher Farid Al-Fadhli (born 6 July 1986) is a Yemeni footballer who played at 2011 AFC Asian Cup qualification.

References

Living people
Yemeni footballers
Yemen international footballers
1986 births
Place of birth missing (living people)
Hassan Abyan players
Al-Tilal SC players
Al-Wehda SC (Aden) players
Al Sha'ab Ibb players
Yemeni League players
Association football defenders